Vaspurakan (Western Armenian pronunciation: Vasbouragan) was the eighth province of the ancient kingdom of Armenia, which later became an independent kingdom during the Middle Ages, centered on Lake Van. Located in what is now southeastern Turkey and northwestern Iran, the region is considered to be the cradle of Armenian civilization.

Name 
The name Vaspurakan is of Iranian origin. It is related of the Middle Persian word vāspuhr, meaning "senior, heir, prince". In Middle Persian, vāspuhrakān referred to the top nobility of the Sasanian Empire. In Armenian, vaspurakan was also rarely used as an adjective meaning "noble"; for example, vaspurakan gund ("army/troop of nobles"). Thus, Vaspurakan can be translated as "noble land" or "land of princes". Alternative interpretations of the name include "having a special position" or "royal domain". Armenologist Heinrich Hübschmann considered it likely that the name originated as a shortening of the koghmn Vaspurakan Gndin ("land of the army/troop of nobles") mentioned by the 7th-century historian Sebeos.

Some scholars believe that Vaspurakan is mentioned by Strabo as Basoropeda. Hübschmann argues that if the province was already commonly called Vaspurakan by Strabo's time (1st century BC-1st century AD), then it should also be found in the works of the early Armenian historians, but it is not mentioned by most of them. Movses Khorenatsi (traditionally dated to the 5th century) is the first to refer to the province by that name, and only on one occasion. Later Armenian historians (e.g. Łewond, Hovhannes Draskhanakerttsi, Tovma Artsruni) refer to the province more frequently, especially after the emergence of the Artsruni-ruled principality in Vaspurakan.

History

From the 9th century BC, Vaspurakan was part of Urartu. In the 6th century BC, it became part of Satrapy of Armenia. From 189 BC, it became one of Greater Armenia's provinces. Then it became part of Arsacid Dynasty of Armenia. After the division of 387, it was included into Persian Armenia. In the 8th century, it fell under Arab control. Many rebellions took place in Vaspurakan. In 885, within the territory of Kingdom of Armenia, it became free.

During most of its history, it was ruled by the Ardzruni dynasty, which first managed to create a principality in the area. At its greatest extent Vaspurakan comprised the lands between Lake Van and Lake Urmia (also known as Kaputan) in 908. In 908 Gagik I of Vaspurakan was recognized King of Armenia by the Abbasid Caliph in competition to the Bagratids, but soon he was reconciled with Ashot II, who recognized him as the King of Vaspurakan. In 1021, Seneqerim Ardzruni gave Vaspurakan to the Byzantine Empire, receiving estates in Sebasteia and surroundings in exchange.

After Vaspurakan was ceded to the Byzantine Empire (Vasprakia Βασπρακία, in Byzantine Greek), it was conquered by Seljuq Turks. Later it was ruled by Ahlatshahs, Ayyubids and Sultanate of Rum successively. In the beginning of the 13th century, part of Vaspurakan was liberated by the Zakarians, but was then conquered by the Mongols, Seljuks, Kara Koyunlu, Iranian Safavids, and then by the Ottoman Turks (though Nader Shah regained it during his short lived Afsharid dynasty).

Cantons (Gavars) 
They usually took the name of the local nakharar (canton chief) that ruled them:

Sites of interest 
 The old city of Van
 Armenian Cathedral of the Holy Cross, former Armenian Catholicosate of Aghtamar on the Isle of Aghtamar
 Varagavank, an Armenian monastery on the slopes of Mt. Varag (9 km. east of Van), founded by King Sennacherib-John early in his reign (1003–1024).  It became the richest and most celebrated monastery of the Lake Van area.  Here, Khrimian Hayrik founded Arciv Vaspurakani (The Eagle of Vaspurakan), the first newspaper ever printed in Armenia.  The archbishop of Van resided here until the late 19th century.
 Chapel of Dzordzor
 The Monastery of Saint Gregory the Illuminator, near Mount Varag
 Naregavank, a destroyed 10th-century Armenian monastery where Krikor Naregatsi is buried
 Karmravank, a 10th-century Armenian monastery on the shores of Lake Van
 Saint Gregory of Goms monastery, on the southern shores of Lake Van
 Saint Thomas Monastery, near the shores of Lake Van
 Saint Bartholomew Monastery
  The Church of the Holy Cross at Soradir
 Hayots Dzor (now Gürpınar plain), the valley in which the Armenian progenitor Hayk defeated the Assyrian king Bel
 Haykaberd, the castle constructed by Hayk in Hayots Dzor
 Plain of Avarayr
 Saint Thaddeus Monastery
 Saint Stepanos Monastery

Notable people
 Khrimian Hayrik
 Aram Manukian

Gallery

References

Bibliography
 
 Der Nersessian, Sirarpie. Armenia and the Byzantine Empire: a Brief Study of Armenian Art and Civilization. Cambridge: Harvard University Press. 1947.

Further reading

External links 

 «Վասպուրական» Հայրենակցական միություն http://vaspurakan.blogspot.com/

 
Provinces of the Kingdom of Armenia (antiquity)